The Arabic keyboard (lawḥat al-mafātīḥ al-`Arabīyyah) is the Arabic keyboard layout used for the Arabic alphabet. All computer Arabic keyboards contain both Arabic letters and Latin letters, the latter being necessary for URLs and e-mail addresses. Since Arabic is written from right to left, when one types with an Arabic keyboard, the letters will start appearing from the right side of the screen.

Layouts

Arabic typewriter 
The Arabic layout typewriter was first patented by Selim Shibli Haddad, a Syrian artist and inventor. A British patent was filed three months later, on 1 December 1899, by Philippe Waked, the first person to type a document in Arabic. Both patents expired in 1919, prompting mass production in both Egypt and abroad.

Sakhr/MSX Arabic Keyboard

IBM PC Arabic Keyboard

Mac Arabic Keyboard

Ubuntu Arabic Keyboard

See also 
 Intellark

References

External links
Typing machines for arabic group languages Patent

Keyboard
Arabic-script keyboard layouts
Input methods